Antti Niemi (born 29 August 1983) is a Finnish former professional ice hockey goaltender. During the 2009–10 season as a member of the Chicago Blackhawks, he became the first Finnish goaltender to win the Stanley Cup. Niemi also played for the San Jose Sharks, Dallas Stars, Pittsburgh Penguins, Florida Panthers, and Montreal Canadiens.

Playing career

Early years
Niemi played junior-level hockey for Kiekko-Vantaa from 1998 until 2005, where he also worked part-time as a Zamboni driver and later had his number retired. He turned pro with the Pelicans of the Finnish SM-liiga in 2005, playing three seasons with the team. In November 2007, Niemi debuted for the Finnish national team. He then signed with the Chicago Blackhawks of the National Hockey League (NHL) as an undrafted free agent in 2008. Assigned to Chicago's minor league affiliate, the Rockford IceHogs, Niemi spent the majority of the 2008–09 season in the American Hockey League (AHL), alternating starts with Corey Crawford. In February 2009, he was called up to the Blackhawks as an injury replacement. He made his NHL debut on 27 February, playing one period in a 5–4 overtime loss to the Pittsburgh Penguins. Niemi recorded his first NHL start and win several days later on 1 March, a 4–2 victory versus the Los Angeles Kings.

Stanley Cup season with Chicago
The following season, Niemi made the Blackhawks lineup out of training camp. The Blackhawks began their season with a back-to-back season opening series against the Florida Panthers, held in Niemi's native Finland in the city of Helsinki. The first game of the season opener was held 2 October 2009. Niemi started the second game, held on 3 October. In that game, Niemi stopped all 23 shots he faced against the Panthers to earn his first NHL shutout.

Compiling a very respectable record of 26–7–4 during the regular season, Niemi was named the Blackhawks' starting goaltender for the playoffs near the end of the 2009–10 NHL regular season and prior to the 2010 Stanley Cup playoffs, replacing Cristobal Huet. During game two of the opening series, Niemi recorded a shutout victory against the Nashville Predators at United Center, making him the first Blackhawks goaltender since Ed Belfour in 1996 to record a post-season shutout. 

On 22 April 2010, Niemi stopped 33 shots to record his second shutout of the post-season, making him the first Chicago goaltender since Tony Esposito in 1974 to record two shutouts in one playoff series. On 16 May 2010, Niemi made 44 saves in a 2–1 victory over the San Jose Sharks in Game 2 of the Western Conference Final. Chicago ended up sweeping the series against San Jose in four games.

In only his second Stanley Cup Finals game, Niemi made 32 saves, earning the Player of the Game honors from the NHL. On 9 June 2010, Niemi led the Blackhawks to a Stanley Cup championship with a 4–3 overtime win over the Philadelphia Flyers. Niemi was the third Finnish goaltender to make it to the Stanley Cup Finals and the first ever to win the Cup.

Niemi filed for arbitration during the off-season, and was eventually awarded $2.75 million. Chicago officially walked away from the deal on 2 August due to salary cap restraints and signed veteran goaltender Marty Turco from the Dallas Stars for $1.3 million.

San Jose Sharks

On 2 September 2010, Niemi officially signed a one-year, $2 million contract with the San Jose Sharks. He made 30 saves in his first regular season victory with the Sharks, a 3–2 win over the Columbus Blue Jackets. After a poor start to the season, Niemi was platooned with fellow Finnish netminder Antero Niittymäki, but strong play in the month of February, which saw him go 14–2–1 with a 1.91 goals against average (GAA) and .924 save percentage, cemented him as the Sharks' starting goaltender. On 1 March 2011, Niemi signed a four-year contract extension with San Jose worth $15.2 million. His nickname with the Sharks was "Nemo."

In October 2012, Niemi signed a one-month contract with Pelicans in Finland during the 2012–13 NHL lockout. In the 2012–13 season, Niemi led the Sharks in GAA with 2.16, while leading the NHL in minutes played with 2,581, tied for the League lead with 24 wins in 43 starts, along with finishing third in the NHL with 1,127 saves. On 8 May 2013, Niemi was nominated for the Vezina Trophy, but ultimately lost out to Sergei Bobrovsky of the Columbus Blue Jackets. With his prowess in the shootout throughout the season The Hockey News awarded Niemi the Gilles Villemure Award as the Best Shootout Goalie.

Dallas Stars
On 27 June 2015, the second day of the 2015 NHL Entry Draft, Niemi's rights were traded to the Dallas Stars in exchange for the 193rd pick in the 2015 draft. The Stars signed Niemi, forming a partnership with fellow Finnish starting goaltender Kari Lehtonen, on a three-year deal worth $13.5 million on 29 June. On 8 October 2015, Niemi started the first game of the season for the Dallas Stars instead of longtime starter Lehtonen, posting a 37 save shutout and picking up two assists in the 3–0 Dallas Stars victory over the Pittsburgh Penguins. Niemi and Lehtonen would alternate regularly for the entire season. In the playoffs, Lehtonen was given the first chance as the starting goaltender before Niemi started a few games as well.

Niemi would continue to alternate with Lehtonen to begin his second season with the Stars in the 2016–17 season. However, Niemi struggled mightily and was relegated to the backup role. Despite winning 12 games, Niemi placed last in the league amongst recorded goaltenders in goals against average and second to last in save percentage. With the Stars missing the post-season and with the acquisition of goaltender Ben Bishop, Niemi was placed on waivers to be bought out from the remaining year of his contract on 26 June 2017.

Pittsburgh Penguins and Florida Panthers
On 1 July 2017, Niemi signed a one-year contract with the Pittsburgh Penguins worth $700,000 for the 2017–18 season. Niemi started three games for the Penguins, during which he allowed 16 goals and recorded a 7.5 goals against average. He was placed on waivers on 23 October.

On 24 October, Niemi was claimed off waivers by the Florida Panthers after being waived the previous day. After featuring in just two winless games with the Panthers, and with the return to health of Roberto Luongo, he was placed on waivers once again on 13 November.

Montreal Canadiens
On 14 November, Niemi was claimed off waivers by the Montreal Canadiens, and became their official backup on 4 January 2018 after the team traded Al Montoya to the Edmonton Oilers.

Niemi posted a 7–5–4 record and a .929 save percentage in 19 total games with the Canadiens. This career resurgence earned him the Montreal chapter of the Professional Hockey Writers' Association's nomination for the Bill Masterton Memorial Trophy and a one-year, $950,000 contract extension with the Canadiens. On 15 January 2019, Niemi set a franchise record for most saves in a regular season home game, stopping 52 shots in a 5–1 win over the Panthers, besting the previous mark of 49 saves shared by Jeff Hackett and Carey Price.

Jokerit
As an impending free agent from the Canadiens following the 2018–19 season, Niemi ended his 11-year NHL career, returning to Finland in signing a one-year contract with Jokerit of the Kontinental Hockey League (KHL), on 5 June 2019.

International play

Niemi won a bronze medal at the 2014 Winter Olympics. He dressed as the backup goaltender for four of Finland's six games, but he did not see any ice time.

Career statistics

Regular season and playoffs

International

Awards and honours

References

External links
 

1983 births
Living people
Chicago Blackhawks players
Dallas Stars players
Finnish ice hockey goaltenders
Florida Panthers players
Ice hockey players at the 2014 Winter Olympics
Jokerit players
Kiekko-Vantaa players
Lahti Pelicans players
Montreal Canadiens players
Olympic bronze medalists for Finland
Pittsburgh Penguins players
Rockford IceHogs (AHL) players
San Jose Sharks players
Sportspeople from Vantaa
Stanley Cup champions
Undrafted National Hockey League players